Kampung Kerdas is a village located in Gombak, Selangor, Malaysia.

Kampung Kerdas is situated alongside Jalan Gombak. Nearby areas neighbouring this village are Kampung Changkat, Taman Kamariah and Taman Gombak Jaya.

See also
 Kampung Padang Balang

Villages in Selangor